Zabrus tenuestriatus is a species of ground beetle in the Craspedozabrus subgenus that is endemic to Morocco. The species was discovered by Léon Fairmaire in 1884 on Casablanca and was similar to Algerian Caelostomus distinctus.

References

Beetles described in 1884
Beetles of North Africa
Endemic fauna of Morocco
Zabrus